Scaevola aemula, commonly known as the fairy fan-flower or common fan-flower, is a species of flowering plant in the family Goodeniaceae. It has mostly egg-shaped leaves and blue, mauve or white fan-shaped flowers. It grows in New South Wales, South Australia and Victoria.

Description
Scaevola aemula is a mat-forming, perennial herb that grows up to 50 cm high with brown, coarsely hairy, terete stems. Flowering occurs mostly from August to October and the fruit are a rounded, wrinkled drupe to 4.5 mm long and covered in soft, short hairs.

Taxonomy and naming
Scaevola aemula was first formally described in 1810 by Robert Brown and the description was published in Prodromus Florae Novae Hollandiae.The specific epithet (aemula) means "striving after".

Cultivation
The species is thought to be the most commonly cultivated of the genus Scaevola, and a large number of cultivars have been developed. Most of these are mat-forming to a height of 12 cm and spreading up to 1 metre in width. It prefers a sunny or partially shaded, well-drained position and tolerates salt spray and periods of drought. Pruning and pinching of tip growth may be carried out to shape the plant. Propagation is from cuttings or by layering.

Distribution and habitat
Fairy fan-flower grows in dry sclerophyll forest mostly on sandy soils from the Eyre Peninsula, through Victoria to Mount Warning in New South Wales.

References

aemula
Flora of South Australia
Flora of Victoria (Australia)
Eudicots of Western Australia
Asterales of Australia
Garden plants of Australia
Plants described in 1810